Ampeloglypter is a genus of true weevils in the tribe Madarini.

Species 
 Ampeloglypter ampelopsis Hustache, A., 1938
 Ampeloglypter ater LeConte, J.L., 1876
 Ampeloglypter binodosus Champion, G.C., 1908
 Ampeloglypter brunescens Hustache, 1951
 Ampeloglypter cayennensis Hustache, 1951
 Ampeloglypter cissi Marshall, G.A.K., 1922
 Ampeloglypter crenatus LeConte, J.L., 1876
 Ampeloglypter definitus Casey, 1922
 Ampeloglypter definitus Casey, T.L., 1922

 Ampeloglypter devinctus Casey, T.L., 1922
 Ampeloglypter elatus Casey, T.L., 1922

 Ampeloglypter furtivus Casey, T.L., 1922

 Ampeloglypter fusiformis Casey, T.L., 1922
 Ampeloglypter heterosternoides Hustache, 1951
 Ampeloglypter inanis Hustache, A., 1938
 Ampeloglypter laevis Hustache, 1951
 Ampeloglypter longiclava Hustache, 1951
 Ampeloglypter longipennis Casey, T.L., 1892

 Ampeloglypter minutus Casey, T.L., 1922
 Ampeloglypter nicaraguensis Solari, F., 1906

 Ampeloglypter nigrinus Casey, T.L., 1922

 Ampeloglypter nugator Casey, T.L., 1922
 Ampeloglypter ovalis Champion, G.C., 1908

 Ampeloglypter pertinax Casey, T.L., 1922
 Ampeloglypter pilosellus Hustache, 1951
 Ampeloglypter plicatipennis Champion, G.C., 1908

 Ampeloglypter probatus Casey, T.L., 1922
 Ampeloglypter sesostris LeConte, J.L., 1876
 Ampeloglypter singularis Hustache, 1951
 Ampeloglypter speculifer Solari, F., 1906
 Ampeloglypter sulcifrons Champion, G.C., 1908

 Ampeloglypter tubulatus Casey, T.L., 1922
 Ampeloglypter vicinus Hustache, 1951
 Ampeloglypter vitis Hustache, A., 1938

References 

Baridinae genera